Herkenhoff is a surname. Its geographic origin may be the region on the current border area between Germany and the Netherlands. The origin and meaning of the name is uncertain. It could be explained through Dutch, German or dialectic words. The second part of the name surely means "yard". The first part could mean Herke [a goddess], Herken [German dialect, meaning "little lord"] or even "herkennen" [Dutch: "to get to know"].

Geographic spreading of this family name
Many Herkenhoff families have their roots in the municipality of Hagen a.T.W. near Osnabrück, in the federal state of Lower Saxony, Germany.  In the 19th century many families emigrated to Brazil, and the United States where there can be found quite a lot of Herkenhoff families as well and where forms of Low German are also spoken.

Famous persons
 Herkenhoff, Paulo, Museum of Modern Art.
 Herkenhoff, Joao Baptista, Brazilian, Human Wrights writer, judge.
 Herkenhoff, Ulrich, Panfluteplayer e.g. The Lord of the Rings.
 Herkenhoff, Regina, Brazilian Chronicle writer.
Herkenhoff, James, Decorated War Veteran.

References

External links
 http://www.herkenhoff.com - Familypage with international links [e.g. herkenhoff.nl]
 http://www.herkenhoff.net - computer company from Ibbenbueren-Laggenbeck
 http://www.art-of-pan.de - Ulrich Herkenhoff [ Panfluteplayer ]
 https://astrogeology.usgs.gov/people/Ken-Herkenhoff Ken Herkenhoff, Geologist

Dutch-language surnames
German-language surnames